The 13th Asian Junior Table Tennis Championships 2007 were held in Hoengseong, Korea, from  25 to 30 July 2007. It was organised by Korea Table Tennis Association under the authority of the Asian Table Tennis Union (ATTU) and International Table Tennis Federation (ITTF).

Medal summary

Events

Medal table

See also

2007 World Junior Table Tennis Championships
Asian Table Tennis Championships
Asian Table Tennis Union

References

Asian Junior and Cadet Table Tennis Championships
Asian Junior and Cadet Table Tennis Championships
Asian Junior and Cadet Table Tennis Championships
Asian Junior and Cadet Table Tennis Championships
Table tennis competitions in South Korea
International sports competitions hosted by South Korea
Asian Junior and Cadet Table Tennis Championships